Caecum armoricum, common name the DeFolin's lagoon snail, is a species of minute sea snail, a marine gastropod mollusk or micromollusk in the family Caecidae.

Description

Distribution
This species occurs in the following locations:
 European waters
 Mediterranean Sea: Greece
 Atlantic Ocean: Azores, Cape Verde

References

 Hoeksema D.F. & Segers W. (1993) On the systematics and distribution of the marine gastropod Caecum armoricum de Folin, 1869 (Prosobranchia, Caecidae). Gloria Maris 31(6): 79-88. 
 Gofas, S.; Le Renard, J.; Bouchet, P. (2001). Mollusca, in: Costello, M.J. et al. (Ed.) (2001). European register of marine species: a check-list of the marine species in Europe and a bibliography of guides to their identification. Collection Patrimoines Naturels, 50: pp. 180–213
 Rolán E., 2005. Malacological Fauna From The Cape Verde Archipelago. Part 1, Polyplacophora and Gastropoda.

Caecidae
Gastropods described in 1869
Brittany
Molluscs of the Atlantic Ocean
Molluscs of Macaronesia
Molluscs of the Mediterranean Sea
Molluscs of the Azores
Gastropods of Cape Verde